1677 Tycho Brahe, provisional designation , is a stony Marian asteroid from the central region of the asteroid belt, approximately  in diameter. It was discovered on 6 September 1940, by Finnish astronomer Yrjö Väisälä at Turku Observatory in Southwest Finland. The common stony S-type asteroid has a short rotation period of 3.89 hours. It was later named after Tycho Brahe, one of the fathers of astronomy.

Classification and orbit 

When applying the hierarchical clustering method to its proper orbital elements, Tycho Brahe is a member of the Maria family, a large family of stony asteroids. Based on osculating Keplerian orbital elements, the asteroid has also been classified as a member of the Eunomia family, the largest family in the intermediate main belt with more than 5,000 members.

It orbits the Sun in the central main-belt at a distance of 2.3–2.8 AU once every 4.03 years (1,472 days; semi-major axis of 2.53 AU). Its orbit has an eccentricity of 0.11 and an inclination of 15° with respect to the ecliptic.

Physical characteristics 

The asteroid has been characterized as a stony S-type by Pan-STARRS survey, and in the SDSS-MFB (Masi Foglia Binzel) taxonomy, which agree with the overall spectral type for members of the Maria family.

Rotation period 

In July 2012, a rotational lightcurve of Tycho Brahe was obtained by Renata Violante and Martha Leake, that gave a short rotation period of 3.89 hours with a brightness variation of 0.38 magnitude.

Diameter and albedo 

According to the survey carried out by NASA's Wide-field Infrared Survey Explorer with its subsequent NEOWISE mission, Tycho Brahe measures 11.78 kilometers in diameter, and its surface has an albedo of 0.221 (revised 2014-figures). The Collaborative Asteroid Lightcurve Link assumes an albedo of 0.21, derived from the family's largest member and namesake, 15 Eunomia, and calculates a diameter of 13.26 kilometers, based on an absolute magnitude of 11.7.

Naming 

This minor planet is named for the great Danish-born astronomer Tycho Brahe (1546–1601) an early forerunner and father of modern astronomy. He is known for his unprecedented precise measurements in the pre-telescopic era. The official  was published by the Minor Planet Center on 15 October 1977. Brahe is also honored by the prominent crater Tycho in the southern highlands of the Moon and by the Martian crater Tycho Brahe. The bright supernova, SN 1572, is also known as Tycho's Nova.

Notes

References

External links 
 Asteroid Lightcurve Database (LCDB), query form (info )
 Dictionary of Minor Planet Names, Google books
 Discovery Circumstances: Numbered Minor Planets (1)-(5000) – Minor Planet Center
 
 

001677
Discoveries by Yrjö Väisälä
Named minor planets
19400906